{{Infobox film
| name           = Across the Continent
| image          = Across the Continent (1922) - Reid.jpg
| caption        = Film still
| director       = Phil Rosen
| producer       = 
| writer         = Byron Morgan
| starring       = 
| music          = 
| cinematography = Charles Schoenbaum
| editing        = 
| studio         = Famous Players-Lasky
| distributor    = Paramount Pictures
| released       = {{Film date|1922|06|04|ref1=<ref>[http://www.afi.com/members/catalog/DetailView.aspx?s=&Movie=1484 The AFI Catalog of Feature Films: Across the Continent]</ref>}}
| runtime        = 61 minutes (6 reels)
| country        = United States
| language       = Silent (English intertitles)
| budget         = 
}}Across the Continent'' is a lost silent film released by Paramount Pictures in June 1922, and was one of star Wallace Reid's last performances.

This film was also the opening night film of the Castro Theatre in San Francisco on June 22, 1922.

Plot
As described in a film magazine, Jimmy Dent (Reid), son of John Dent (Roberts) the maker of the reliable but plain Dent automobiles, is dismissed from the firm after he refuses to drive a Dent. He goes west with the Tyler family, owners of a rival automobile firm, in one of their expensive high speed cars. The elder Dent attempts to break the cross-country record held by a Tyler automobile with a Dent vehicle, but Tyler's men waylay his drivers. Jimmy offers a cash prize for a free-for-all cross-country race, and drives the Dent when his father's driver betrays him. He passes the slate of drivers when rain in the mountains ties them up and wins the race driving the trusty Dent. Jimmy ends up marrying the elder Dent's effective stenographer Louise Fowler (MacLaren), who dons a mechanic's overalls to help in the big finish.

Cast
 Wallace Reid as Jimmy Dent
 Mary MacLaren as Louise Fowler
 Theodore Roberts as John Dent
 Betty Francisco as Lorraine Tyler
 Walter Long as Dutton Tyler
 Lucien Littlefield as Scott Tyler
 Jack Herbert as Art Roger
 Guy Oliver as Irishman
 Sidney D'Albrook as Tom Brice

Production
The Dent automobiles were Ford Model T's with disguised radiators.

See also
Wallace Reid filmography

References

External links

 
 

1922 films
American silent feature films
American black-and-white films
Paramount Pictures films
Films directed by Phil Rosen
Lost American films
1922 lost films
1920s American films